In mathematics, specifically in order theory, a binary relation  on a vector space  over the real or complex numbers is called Archimedean if for all  whenever there exists some  such that  for all positive integers  then necessarily  
An Archimedean (pre)ordered vector space is a (pre)ordered vector space whose order is Archimedean. 
A preordered vector space  is called almost Archimedean if for all  whenever there exists a  such that  for all positive integers  then

Characterizations 

A preordered vector space  with an order unit  is Archimedean preordered if and only if  for all non-negative integers  implies

Properties 

Let  be an ordered vector space over the reals that is finite-dimensional.

Order unit norm 

Suppose  is an ordered vector space over the reals with an order unit  whose order is Archimedean and let  

Examples 

The space  of bounded real-valued maps on a set  with the pointwise order is Archimedean ordered with an order unit  (that is, the function that is identically  on ). 

Examples 

Every order complete vector lattice is Archimedean ordered. 
However, a totally ordered vector order of dimension  can not be Archimedean ordered. 
There exist ordered vector spaces that are almost Archimedean but not Archimedean.

The Euclidean space  over the reals with the lexicographic order is  Archimedean ordered since  for every  but

See also

References

Bibliography

  
  

Functional analysis
Order theory